Paweł Wróbel (born April 24, 1984 in Jasło, Poland) is a Polish organist.

Biography 
Wróbel studied at the Frederic Chopin Academy of Music in Warsaw with Andrzej Chorosiński, the University of Music and Performing Arts in Stuttgart with Jon Laukvik and the University of Music and Performing Arts in Graz with Gunther Rost. In 2012 he received a doctorate in musical arts at the Ignacy Jan Paderewski Academy of Music in Poznań.

He had won prizes in international organ competitions, include third prize during Miami International Organ Competition.

In 2007 he received a prestigious scholarship from Keimyung Research Foundation at the University of Seoul.

During the concert of the Club of Young Polish Composers, which took place within the confines of festival “Warsaw Autumn” (on 20 September 2008) he performed the following four compositions: Stained glass by Barbara Kaszuba, Trans. For. My Emptiness (Transforma) by Klaudia Pasternak, Proxima Centauri by Mateusz Ryczek, Deformations by Jacek Sotomski and he took part in compact disc ”live” recording of this concert by Musicon, Warsaw 2008.

Awards 
 2005: Nowowiejski International Organ Competition in Poznań
 2006: Sweelinck International Organ Competition in Gdańsk
 2011: Zürich  Internationaler Orgelwettbewerb
 2012: Miami International Organ Competition

Publications 
 Organ transcription of Funérailles by Franz Liszt, Polihymnia, Lublin.

References

External links 
Official website www.pawel-wrobel.com
Pipedreams, Celebrating the pipe organ, the King of Instruments
Official You Tube channel

1984 births
Living people
State University of Music and Performing Arts Stuttgart alumni
Polish organists
Male organists
21st-century organists
21st-century male musicians